Roderick Kingsley is a fictional character appearing in American comic books published by Marvel Comics. Originally created by Roger Stern and Mike Zeck for Peter Parker, the Spectacular Spider-Man #43 (June 1980), the character was later brought back in the 1997 storyline Spider-Man: Hobgoblin Lives, in which he was revealed as the first and most prominent incarnation of the supervillain Hobgoblin, created by Stern and John Romita Jr. in The Amazing Spider-Man #238 (March 1983), and previously revealed to be the assassinated Ned Leeds in 1987, the latter being retroactively revealed to have been a brainwashed patsy manipulated by Kingsley over the course of the Hobgoblin Lives storyline.

A conniving fashion designer in New York City, Kingsley gained access to one of Norman Osborn's lairs that housed the Green Goblin's equipment. Kingsley upgraded the inventions and perfected the Goblin formula, which enhanced his physical abilities and intellect without insanity. Adopting a Halloween-themed appearance and an arsenal of weapons similar to that of his predecessor, including explosive "Pumpkin Bombs", razor-sharp bats, and a high-tech "Goblin Glider", Kingsley became the criminal mastermind known as the Hobgoblin. He has persisted as one of the superhero Spider-Man's most enduring enemies and belongs to the collective of adversaries that make up web-slinger's rogues gallery.

In 2009, the Hobgoblin was ranked by IGN’s as the 57th-greatest comic book villain of all time. The character has been featured in various media adaptations, such as television series and video games.

Publication history

Roderick Kingsley made his first appearance in Peter Parker, the Spectacular Spider-Man #43 (June 1980) and was created by Roger Stern, Mike Zeck and John Romita Jr.

The Hobgoblin's identity was not initially revealed, generating one of the longest-running mysteries in the Spider-Man comics. According to Stern, "I plotted that first story with no strong idea of who the Hobgoblin was. As I was scripting those gorgeous pages from JR [John Romita Jr.], particularly the last third of the book, and developing the Hobgoblin's speech pattern, I realized who he was. It was Roderick Kingsley, that sunuvabitch corporate leader I had introduced in my first issue of Spectacular". A handful of readers deduced that Kingsley was the Hobgoblin almost immediately. In order to throw readers off the scent and provide a retroactive explanation for his inconsistent characterization of Kingsley in his early appearances, Stern came up with the idea of Kingsley having his brother Daniel Kingsley sometimes impersonate him, sealing the deception by having the Hobgoblin appear in the same room as Kingsley in The Amazing Spider-Man #249.

Stern's original plan was to have the mystery of the Hobgoblin's identity run exactly one issue longer than that of the Green Goblin's identity, meaning the truth would be revealed in The Amazing Spider-Man #264. However, Stern left the series after The Amazing Spider-Man #252, and his successors felt Kingsley was a weak choice for the Hobgoblin's true identity. Thus, the Hobgoblin was ultimately unmasked as Ned Leeds in The Amazing Spider-Man #289 (after considerable creative struggle over the issue), and Jason Macendale took over as the Hobgoblin.

Stern was unhappy with the revelation that the Hobgoblin's civilian identity was Leeds and wrote the three-issue miniseries Spider-Man: Hobgoblin Lives in 1997, with the retcon that Kingsley was the original Hobgoblin and had brainwashed Leeds as a fall guy. Stern followed up the miniseries with the Spider-Man storyline "Goblins at the Gate", which resulted in Kingsley and Norman Osborn being bitter rivals obsessed with each other's destruction over the Goblin legacy, although Leeds would later be retconned further by a different writer to have also been a willing Hobgoblin.

Fictional character biography
Roderick Kingsley started out as a socialite, fashion designer and billionaire who had criminal underworld connections and had come about his wealth through unethical business practices and corporate raiding. Coincidentally, Kingsley was an employer of Mary Jane Watson for a time. As a means of avoiding the drill of day-to-day appearances, he had his timid identical twin brother Daniel Kingsley pose as him to run his corporation. Kingsley's activities gave him many enemies, one of which was Bella Donna (Narda Ravanna), a rival fashion designer whose business he had ruined and attempted revenge on Kingsley but is twice thwarted by Spider-Man.

After these incidents, Kingsley seeks to protect himself and his empire by gaining more power. The thug George Hill reports to Kingsley of stumbling upon Norman Osborn's secret lair in hopes of earning a reward. Kingsley instead kills Hill to make sure that no one else gets wind of the discovery. Upon examining the lair and gleaning its secrets, Kingsley decides to use the Goblin equipment. Arriving to the conclusion that all the previous Green Goblin mantle wearers went mad, he instead creates a similar but different mantle: the Hobgoblin identity. Soon afterwards, he encounters Spider-Man. He uses some of Osborn's files to blackmail prominent figures, and attempts to buy Osborn's old corporation Oscorp and merge it with his own. These schemes bring him into conflict with Spider-Man. Among Osborn's notes, Kingsley also finds incomplete remnants of Mendel Stromm's strength enhancing potion and was obsessed with finding the complete formula or perfecting the incomplete notes. During his various criminal activities, Kingsley repeatedly loses to Spider-Man, as he lacked raw physical power. Kingsley eventually perfected the strength-enhancing formula, but, aware that Osborn was driven insane, Kingsley opts to test on someone else first, tricking small-time hood Lefty Donovan after using a mind-control device developed by Gerhard Winkler (Osborn's former employee). With Donovan having administered the Goblin formula and then in the Hobgoblin costume to fight Spider-Man, Kingsley monitored his pawn's vital signs and behavior from a distance. When Spider-Man overwhelms and unmasks Donovan and the brainwashing begins to fail, Kingsley acts to protect his identity by programming Donovan's glider to crash into a building, instantly killing Donovan. Judging the experiment a success, Kingsley immerses himself in his completed formula derivative and gains greater strength than the original Goblin. He uses this strength to battle Spider-Man and the Black Cat. Despite his increased abilities, he is still narrowly defeated by Spider-Man. Worse, he attracts the attention of powerful criminal interests who perceive him as a threat, including the Kingpin. It is also revealed later that during this time, after the Hobgoblin made his appearance, Norman (presumed to be dead at the time) made a brief return to New York City in an attempt to deal with this Goblin, but ultimately abandoned this for the sake of schemes against Spider-Man. After a bitter encounter with Spider-Man, Kingsley discovers he had been followed by Daily Bugle reporter Ned Leeds having discovered his lair. Kingsley captured Leeds and brainwashes the reporter with Winkler's device into being the Hobgoblin. Kingsley discovered that Leeds had been working with Richard Fisk on a plan to bring down the Kingpin's empire as Richard adopted the Rose crime lord identity, using Leeds to handle some negotiations, and fooling many criminals into believing that his pawn was the Hobgoblin and hoping to use the Kingpin's downfall to advance his own interests. As Leeds gets too erratic to function as a decoy, Kingsley arranged for Leeds to be assassinated by Jason Macendale and the Foreigner while on a trip to Berlin, and decided to retire from the Hobgoblin identity.

During the events of Secret Wars II, Kingsley is recruited by Mephisto to join the Legion Accursed, a team of ninety-nine supervillains who try to destroy the Beyonder. The Hobgoblin later kidnaps Harry Osborn. He battles Osborn who uses his own father's weaponry against the Hobgoblin.

After a retirement of several years, Kingsley returns to New York. He kills Macendale to prevent from giving the authorities information that would jeopardize his secret identity in addition to seeing Macendale an unworthy successor. Learning that Betty Brant has begun to investigate Ned's activities as the Hobgoblin—informed of the truth by Spider-Man after realizing that the Foreigner's human operatives could never have killed Leeds if Leeds had been super-powered—Kingsley kidnaps Betty and sets a trap for Spider-Man.  In the final fracas, Daniel is captured and the Hobgoblin is unmasked, clearing Ned's name. Roderick is taken to prison, imprisoned in the same cell where he killed Macendale. Despite  his unmasking, due to Kingsley's deceptive natures, it is difficult to determine of whether he is telling the whole truth.

Furious at Norman's return and denial of being the Goblin, Kingsley spreads rumors that there exists a secret journal of Osborn's that proves beyond a doubt of being the Goblin, but this was later revealed to be a ruse, knowing Osborn has been sending spies on him: all of the journals in his possession had been destroyed during a battle with Spider-Man years before. He offers to barter this information, for his freedom, with the District Attorney, guessing that Osborn will try to get to him first. Osborn, deciding to make a deal with Kingsley, breaks him out of prison. Kingsley is then confronted by both Osborn and another Green Goblin. Osborn provides Kingsley with new Goblin equipment, and both Goblins swoop in to collect Daniel, now in protective custody, who Roderick claims knows the final journal's location. Spider-Man defends Daniel, but is drugged and both men are taken back to Osborn. Osborn knew Kingsley was lying about the journal and has bought Kingsley's company out from underneath him; the purpose of helping Kingsley escape is for Osborn to eliminate the one person who possibly can prove that Osborn is the Goblin personally. Kingsley furiously attacks Osborn who is shocked to discover that Kingsley is stronger and thus fails at killing him. The building began to burn as a result of their battle, and Spider-Man escapes with Daniel. All three of the villains managed to escape as well. With several million dollars hidden away in foreign bank accounts, Kingsley quietly moves to a small island in the Caribbean to enjoy his retirement.

Kingsley is seemingly killed by Phil Urich who takes on the Hobgoblin mantle, but this was in fact Daniel with Roderick still active in Ecuador under the alias of Devil-Spider. Roderick learns that his brother has been murdered and plans his return to New York. Kingsley arrives in New York City and returns to the Hobgoblin role, intending to go after Urich. Kingsley attacks Urich and the Kingpin in Shadowland. After a brief battle between the two Hobgoblins, Parker and Max Modell escape with the Goblin Key (a key to one of the Goblin warehouses). Kingsley and Urich decide to call a brief truce and go after them. After accessing the warehouse, Peter utilizes the Goblin tech to make himself a "Spider-Glider" and manages to escape. Urich insists on going after but Kingsley stuns Urich with a taser so they can both escape. Kingsley decides to let Urich remain the Hobgoblin, but only if Urich gives him a cut of whatever profits are made.

Kingsley obtains one of Mysterio's suits which he sells to a criminal who takes on the name Mysterion. He sells the Crime Master's gear to an unnamed Maggia operative. He ends up in a gang war with the Goblin Nation, selling equipment to low-level criminals who became the latest versions of 8-Ball, Answer, Blaze, Devil-Spider, Gibbon, Hitman, Killer Shrike, Mauler, Melter, Ringer, Steeplejack, Tumbler, and Unicorn as well as a new villain named Bruin who wears one of Grizzly's old exoskeleton bear suits. He is killed by the first Goblin King while his henchmen are claimed for the Goblin Nation, but his butler Claude went in his place so that his enemies could be distracted and Kingsley is actually in Paris. Kingsley decides to lay low once again working on his personal empire. It was later revealed that Kingsley sold costumes and gear that made the latest versions of Hydro-Man, Tiger Shark, Squid, and Beetle.

During the "AXIS" storyline, Kingsley appears as a member of Magneto's unnamed supervillain group during the fight against the Red Skull's Red Onslaught form. When Magneto arrives to recruit him, Kingsley attacks and is subjugated and forced to join Magneto's team. Kingsley accompanies Magneto and the other villains recruited to Genosha. The inversion spell caused by Doctor Doom and Scarlet Witch affects not only the Red Skull but all those present in Genosha, making the superheroes present evil and the supervillains present good. Following his inversion, Kingsley returns to New York and finds himself happier with his inversion, although still motivated by greed rather than altruism. He reactivates his franchises where he leases the personas and costumes of deceased or retired superheroes to ordinary people, but remains a wanted criminal. He also enfranchises his Hobgoblin persona to various people to perform heroic deeds as Hobgoblin and publishes a comic about the group for promotion. Among those who answer an ad are the amnesiac Lily Hollister and the underemployed teenager John Myers. Other attendees include a different Demolition Man, Flower Girl, Leather Boy, a new Razorback, and a new Water Wizard. He sets a three phase program including a book and various articles with his brand and underground speeches named after Ned for people to make their own franchises in exchange for a share of their profits. Kingsley debuts his Hob-Heroes: Lily as Queen Cat, Myers as Missile Mate, Flower Girl, Leatherboy, Rocket Head, and Water Wizard. When the second Goblin King confronts Kingsley in his headquarters, Myers is convinced by Urich's claims that Kingsley will soon abandon the heroes he has trained. Missile Mate goes to Urich's headquarters and asks to join to be a supervillain. Urich is reluctant, but Myers shows also gathering all the supervillains Kingsley "abandoned" after being a good guy. When the celebration of a "Hobgoblin Day" is being held with a parade in Kingsley's honor, Missile Mate betrays Kingsley and attempts to murder him in the Goblin King's name. Kingsley has already expected the betrayal and has been using a hologram decoy which takes Missile Mate's blow. As soon as Kinglsey confronts Missile Mate, Urich appears with the Goblin Nation and attacks the celebration. Kingsley bests Urich in combat and leaves his rival to the authorities. After, he is approached by Steve Rogers to be part of a team of Avengers with the objective to stop the inverted X-Men from detonating a gene bomb which would kill everyone on the Earth who wasn't a mutant. The Avengers team that Kingsley joins is called the Astonishing Avengers. After the reinversion spell is cast to restore the Avengers and X-Men members that were affected by it back to the side of good, Kingsley is evil again.

Kingsley starts to get his old franchises back under control. Outside of recruiting Blizzard, Kingsley regains his former minions Beetle, Bruin, Hitman, Ringer, and Unicorn as well as establishing his versions of Cutthroat, Diamondback, Mockingbird, and Viper. When franchisee Porcupine informs him of an intent to end the contract, Kingsley tries to kill with a Pumpkin Bomb in order to reclaim said suit for future franchisees. In the resulting battle with Porcupine and crimefighting mentor Spider-Woman, Kingsley is taken down by Captain Marvel.

Kingsley turns up as a member of the Sinister Six led by the Iron Spider. He accompanies the Sinister Six in a plot to steal a decommissioned S.H.I.E.L.D. Helicarrier.

Powers, abilities, and weaknesses
Roderick Kingsley initially had no superhuman abilities, but possessed a keen analytical intellect with enough knowledge of chemistry and biology to understand Mendel Stromm's notes regarding the Goblin formula. Kingsley not only recreated the formula but perfected by removing side-effects. Further, he updated many of Osborn's various Goblin inventions. With a technological means developed by Brainwasher, Kingsley can control the human mind through hypnosis and programming, typically to create stand-ins for himself. Kingsley was skilled in the management of both criminal organizations and legally run professional businesses. Due to his green chemical solution exposure, Kingsley possesses superhuman strength on par with Spider-Man and stronger than Osborn (due to its improvements and duration of Kingsley's exposure was longer). Likewise, his reflexes, speed, stamina, and intellect were also enhanced to superhuman levels. As the Hobgoblin, he wore bulletproof mail with an overlapping tunic, cape, and cowl. A computerized system cybernetically causes the finger-blasters to randomly vary their attack vectors when trained on a particular target. He uses a Goblin glider, a one-man miniature turbo-fan-powered vertical thrust, cybernetically-controlled vehicle. It can reach high velocities and is extremely maneuverable. He uses concussion and incendiary Jack O'Lanterns, wraith-shaped smoke and gas-emitting bombs, bat shaped razor-edged throwing blades, and gloves woven with micro-circuited power conducting filaments which channel pulsed discharges of electricity. He wore a shoulder bag to carry his small, portable weaponry.

Other versions

MC2
Roderick Kingsley made his MC2 debut as a hired assassin to kill many of the Spider-Girl characters, including Normie Osborn, Spider-Girl, and Peter Parker. After a fight against both Spider-Girl and her father, he came close to victory, but at the end his only success lay in killing the Venom symbiote, and also in escaping without a trace. He attempted a complex plot to become the new kingpin of crime, but was undone due to an act of treachery by his partner, the Mindworm. Killing the Mindworm, and deciding the New York underworld had become too "hot" for him at the moment, he chose to return to the Caribbean, but vowed someday to come back and finish off Spider-Girl. He is later revealed to be the instigator of a mob war against the Black Tarantula, returning to New York to finish the job. He defeated American Dream and the New Warriors. He then dropped them from a great height, planning to kill Spider-Girl as she tried to save them. However, he himself was then killed by Mayhem, Spider-Girl's half-symbiote clone.

Old Man Logan
In the pages of Old Man Logan that took place on Earth-21923, Hobgoblin was among the villains that attacked the Avengers in Connecticut. He worked with the Vulture to fight Wasp only for Wasp to use her stingers to shoot Hobgoblin off his Goblin Glider.

Amazing Spider-Man: Renew Your Vows
During the "Secret Wars" storyline in the pages of Amazing Spider-Man: Renew Your Vows, Hobgoblin appears as a member of Regent's Sinister Six where they are tasked to hunt down Spider-Man. During the fight with Spider-Man, Hobgoblin's hand was webbed up by Spider-Man before he could throw his Pumpkin Bomb which led to Hobgoblin getting killed in its explosion.

Spider-Man: Spider's Shadow 
Around the events of Amazing Spider-Man #258 (November 1984), Hobgoblin battles with black suit Spider-Man; during the fight, Hobgoblin is unmasked as Roderick Kingsley, so Spider-Man threatens to Kingsley to not attack innocent civilians anymore. Kingsley causes an explosion at May Parker's house when he sees Spider-Man change into Peter Parker using the Venom symbiote; The symbiote shifts blame into Kingsley for May's death, and changes into a monstrous form. Spider-Man uses his fingers to kill Kingsley, who is regarded as Spider-Man's first victim.

In other media

Television
 An amalgamated incarnation of the Hobgoblin appears in Spider-Man, voiced by Mark Hamill. This version is Jason Philips (full name Jason Philip Macendale) and is based on the Roderick Kingsley and Jason Macendale incarnations of the Hobgoblin.
 Roderick Kingsley appears in The Spectacular Spider-Man episode "Accomplices", voiced by Courtney B. Vance. This version is an African American perfume mogul who outbids Tombstone, Silvermane, and Doctor Octopus for super-soldier specifications. He is later attacked by Sable Manfredi and Hammerhead, both of whom are attempting to steal the prize for their respective employers, but Spider-Man and the Rhino later intervene, which results in the specifications' destruction.
 Roderick Kingsley / Hobgoblin appears in Marvel Super Hero Adventures, voiced by Andrew Francis.

Video games
 Roderick Kingsley / Hobgoblin appears as an assist character in the PSP and PS2 versions of Spider-Man: Web of Shadows.
 Roderick Kingsley / Hobgoblin appears in Marvel: Ultimate Alliance 2 as an alternate costume for the Green Goblin.
 Roderick Kingsley / Hobgoblin appears as a playable character in Lego Marvel Super Heroes 2.

Merchandise
 Bowen Designs released a bust of Roderick Kingsley / Hobgoblin in 2005.
 In 2009, Hasbro released a 3¾-inch Roderick Kingsley / Hobgoblin action figure for their Marvel Universe toyline.

Collected editions

Notes

See also

References

External links
 Hobgoblin I at Marvel.com

 SpideyKicksButt.com: "Squandered Legacy: The Rise and Fall of the Hobgoblin"
 Peter David site: "Foolish Consistencies and..."

Characters created by John Romita Jr.
Comics characters introduced in 1980
Fictional businesspeople
Fictional characters from New York City
Fictional goblins
Fictional mass murderers
Fictional prison escapees
Marvel Comics scientists
Marvel Comics characters who can move at superhuman speeds
Marvel Comics characters with accelerated healing
Marvel Comics characters with superhuman strength
Marvel Comics male supervillains
Marvel Comics mutates
Fictional identical twins
Characters created by Roger Stern
Fictional inventors
Fictional chemists
Spider-Man characters
Hobgoblin (comics)